Frank Guthrie may refer to:

 Frank Guthrie (politician) (1893–1955), Australian politician
 Frank Guthrie (rugby union) (1869–1954), South African rugby player
 Frank Edwin Guthrie (1923-1994), entomologist, recipient of the 1983 North Carolina Award for Science
 Frank Guthrie (swimming coach), member of the International Swimming Hall of Fame

See also
 Francis Guthrie (1831–1899), South African mathematician and botanist